Zhang Yihe (born 1942) is a Chinese writer and historian. She is the daughter of writer Zhang Bojun, an intellectual denounced as a "rightist" during Mao Zedong's Anti-Rightist Movement in the 1950s. She is a graduate of the National Academy of Chinese Theatre Arts. She is the author of a history of early figures in the Republic of China, and of Lingren Wangshi, a history of Peking opera stars.

Censorship 
In January 2007, Wu Shulin, the deputy director of the General Administration of Press and Publications, had read out a list of books that "violated regulations." Her volume was third on the list. Wu told the publishers: "We have reminded you repeatedly about this person.  Her books are not to be published ... you dared to publish it.  This book is banned because of that person." The publishing house, Hunan Literature Publishers, was then punished.

This incident prompted Zhang to begin a campaign against China's book censor at the time, Long Xinmin, sending letters and petitions to the government and demanding a change in the way books are censored. In one open letter, titled "My Statement and Position," she writes: "I know -- in Mister Wu's eyes, Zhang Yihe is a rightist.  Alright, so let us say that I am rightist.  Then I ask: Is a rightist a citizen?  In contemporary China, a rightist cannot speak or write?  Everybody knows that as soon as there is a society, there will be leftists, centrists and rightists, of which the leftists will always be a minority.  Does our country only allow leftists to speak and publish?  Should the broad mass of centrists and rights shut up?  If this is true, then we better immediately amend our constitution to state who is allowed to publish and enjoy the basic rights of citizenship; and who is not allowed to publish and cannot enjoy the basic rights of citizenship."

Zhang's was one among eight books to be censored. Her previous two books, The Past is Not Like Smoke (also translated as The Past Has Not Gone Up in Smoke) and A Memoir of Ma Lianliang, were also banned for what South China Morning Post called "uncomfortable recollections of political campaigns."

Body of Work 
Having grown up in a family of intellectuals quintessential to the experience of the early years of the founding of the People's Republic of China, Zhang had first-hand access to the political and culture figures of the 1950s and 1960s. Her memoir-style work of the early 2000s—which differed considerably from the state-sanctioned, cathartic "scar literature' of the 1970s and 1980s—was groundbreaking is providing an objective expose of the "unimaginable cruelty and atrocity of political movements and the actions of the authorities who created the environment for the Red Guards and the Gang of Four to commit their crimes."

The Past is Not Like Smoke 
Zhang's works highlight episodes in which family members and friends are forced to betray one another in the name of revolution. In The Past is Not Like Smoke, for instance, Zhang tells the life stories of eight intellectuals and officials who became friends, and explains how they suffered in the Party's political campaigns. Those narrated include key players in the early establishment of the People's Republic, including Shi Liang, the minister of justice and deputy chairman of the standing committee of the National People's Congress; Chu Anping, editor-in-chief of the Guangming Daily; Pan Su and husband Zhang Boju (not to be confused with Zhang Yihe's father Zhang Bojun), a scholar and director of the Beijing Zhongshan Calligraphy and Painting Society; Luo Yufeng, the daughter of the late-Qing reformist intellectual Kang Youwei, Nie Gannu, a renowned writer and member of the Chinese People's Political Consultative Conference; and Luo Longji, the minister of forestry and a member of the standing committee of the CPPCC.

Her writing "stresse[s] the importance of not allowing history to be forgotten, a deeply sensitive issue," according to Richard Spenser of The Telegraph. The banning of her book Lingren Wangshi inspired her response to the authorities.

Zhang has written commentaries on Ai Weiwei and many other issues of contemporary import.

References 

Living people
1942 births
People's Republic of China historians
20th-century Chinese women writers
20th-century Chinese writers
Historians from Chongqing
21st-century Chinese women writers
21st-century Chinese writers
National Academy of Chinese Theatre Arts alumni
Chinese women historians
Scholars of Chinese opera